The Murtoi Formation is a geologic formation in vicinity of Lake Gusinoye in Russia. It was deposited in the late Barremian to the mid Aptian of the Early Cretaceous.

Paleofauna
Kirgizemys dmitrievi
Tengrisaurus starkovi
Khurendukhosaurus bajkalensis
Murtoilestes abramovi 
Stichopterus sp.
Psittacosaurus.sp

See also 
 List of dinosaur-bearing rock formations
 List of stratigraphic units with few dinosaur genera
 List of fossiliferous stratigraphic units in Russia

References

Bibliography

Further reading 
 I. G. Danilov, A. O. Averianov, P. P. Skutschas and A. S. Rezvyi. 2006. Kirgizemys (Testudines, 'Macrobaenidae'): new material from the Lower Cretaceous of Buryatia (Russia) and taxonomic revision. Russian Journal of Herpetology 1:46-62

Geologic formations of Russia
Lower Cretaceous Series of Asia
Cretaceous Russia
Aptian Stage
Barremian Stage
Conglomerate formations
Sandstone formations
Geography of Northeast Asia